{{Automatic taxobox
| image = Aria et al. ELRC 20001 head.png
| image_caption = Head region of Innovatiocaris maotianshanensis
| image2 = 20210624_Innovatiocaris_maotianshanensis.png
| image2_caption = Life restoration of I. maotianshanensis
| fossil_range = Cambrian Series 2, Stage 3, 
| taxon = Innovatiocaris
| authority = Zeng et al., 2022
| type_species = Innovatiocaris maotianshanensis
| type_species_authority = Zeng et al., 2022
| subdivision_ranks = Other species
| subdivision = * I.? multispiniformis Zeng et al., 2022
 I.? sp. Zeng et al., 2022
}}Innovatiocaris (meaning "innovation crab") is a genus of radiodont of uncertain family from the early Cambrian Chengjiang Lagerstätte of Yunnan Province, China. The genus contains two named species, I. maotianshanensis, known from a nearly complete individual and isolated frontal appendages, and I.? multispiniformis, known from a complete frontal appendage.

Discovery and naming 

The holotype specimen of Innovatiocaris maotianshanensis, ELRC 20001 was long considered in scientific literature as "Anomalocaris sp". or Anomalocaris saron (=Houcaris saron). However, in 2022, Zeng et al. described it as a new genus and species of radiodont. The holotype consists of the nearly complete remains of a young individual, preserved on a part and counterpart. A brief description of the specimen was provided in Chen et al. (1994); despite its popularity in popular science literature, however, it did not receive a detailed description until 2022. ELRC 20011 and 20012, additional specimens collected in 1990, consist of isolated frontal appendages. These were designated as paratypes. The specimens were collected from the Maotianshan Shale of the Yu'anshan Formation of Maotianshan, Chengjiang, Yunnan Province, China. The generic name, "Innovatiocaris", is derived from the Latin words "innovatio", meaning "innovation" (honoring the 'innovative spirits" of Junyuan Chen, a scientist who contributed to research of the Chengjiang Lagerstätte) and "caris", meaning "crab". The specific name, "maotianshanensis", is derived from "Maotianshan", the location where the holotype was discovered.

NIGP 177621, the holotype of Innovatiocaris.? multispiniformis, was collected from the same locality as the I. maotianshanensis holotype. It consists of a complete frontal appendage. The appendage of I.? multispiniformis consists of 13 distal articulated podomeres, as opposed to the 11 podomeres found in I. maotianshanensis and I.? sp. This may be a unique feature or the result of incomplete preservation. The specific name, "multispiniformis", is derived from the roots "multi", meaning "multiple", and "spiniformis", meaning "spinous", in reference to the multiple spines on the frontal appendages.

An additional specimen, NIGP 177620, was assigned to Innovatiocaris? sp. by Zeng et al. (2022). It consists of a complete frontal appendage, preserved on a part and counterpart. The specimen was collected from the Maotianshan Shale Member of the Yu'anshan Formation in Jianshan, Haikou, Yunnan Province, China. It likely represents a distinct species from I. maotianshanensis.

Classification 
Innovatiocaris was likely closely related to Anomalocaris kunmingensis and Laminacaris. Some of its features seem to indicate an affinity with the Hurdiidae, though it is more similar to non-hurdiids than to members of the Hurdiidae. The results of two different phylogenetic analyses by Zeng et al. (2022) are displayed in the cladograms below:

Topology 1: Strict consensus tree

Topology 2: 50% majority-rule consensus tree

References 

Fossil taxa described in 2022
Cambrian arthropods
Cambrian China
Maotianshan shales fossils